Psalm 46 is the 46th psalm of the Book of Psalms, beginning in English in the King James Version: "God is our refuge and strength, a very present help in trouble". In the slightly different numbering system used in the Greek Septuagint and Latin Vulgate translations of the Bible, this psalm is Psalm 45. In Latin, it is known as "Deus noster refugium et virtus". The song is attributed to the sons of Korah.

The psalm forms a regular part of Jewish, Catholic, Lutheran, Anglican and other Protestant liturgies. According to Charles Spurgeon, Psalm 46 is called a "song of holy confidence"; it is also known as "Luther's Psalm", as Martin Luther wrote his popular hymn "Ein feste Burg ist unser Gott" ("A Mighty Fortress Is Our God") using Psalm 46 as a starting point. Luther's hymn has been quoted in many musical works, both religious and secular, including Bach's cantata Ein feste Burg ist unser Gott, BWV 80. Johann Pachelbel set the psalm in German and Marc-Antoine Charpentier Jean Philippe Rameau in Latin, among many others.

Text

Hebrew Bible version 
Following is the Hebrew text of Psalm 46:

King James Version 
 God is our refuge and strength, a very present help in trouble.
 Therefore will not we fear, though the earth be removed, and though the mountains be carried into the midst of the sea;
 Though the waters thereof roar and be troubled, though the mountains shake with the swelling thereof. Selah.
 There is a river, the streams whereof shall make glad the city of God, the holy place of the tabernacles of the most High.
 God is in the midst of her; she shall not be moved: God shall help her, and that right early.
 The heathen raged, the kingdoms were moved: he uttered his voice, the earth melted.
 The  of hosts is with us; the God of Jacob is our refuge. Selah.
 He maketh wars to cease unto the end of the earth; he breaketh the bow, and cutteth the spear in sunder; he burneth the chariot in the fire.
 Be still, and know that I am God: I will be exalted among the heathen, I will be exalted in the earth.
 The  of hosts is with us; the God of Jacob is our refuge. Selah.

Structure
The text is divided into three sections, each ending with a Selah, after verses 4, 8 and 12 according to the Hebrew verse numbering.

Themes 
According to Matthew Henry, this psalm may have been composed after David defeated the enemies of ancient Israel from surrounding lands. Spurgeon notes that the description in verse 1 in the Hebrew Bible version, calling for the psalm to be played "on alamot", could denote either a high-pitched musical instrument or the soprano voices of young girls who went out to dance in celebration of David's victory over the Philistines. The Jerusalem Bible renders this word as an oboe. The Midrash Tehillim, however, parses the word alamot as referring to the "hidden things" that God does for his people. The psalm praises God for being a source of power and salvation in times of trouble.

There is a difference of opinion among Christian scholars as to which "river" the psalm is referring to in verse 4 of the KJV, the streams of which make glad the city of God. Among the possibilities are:
 The Jordan River. For this reason, some have found this possibility unlikely.
 A river in Jerusalem during the millennial reign of Christ. This river will run from beneath the Temple in Jerusalem eastward to the Dead Sea, as described in the forty-seventh chapter of the Book of Ezekiel.
 A river in Jerusalem after the millennial reign of Christ. This is the river that flows from the New Jerusalem, as described in the twenty-second chapter of the New Testament Book of Revelation.

It has been proposed that this psalm is prophesying the kingdom of God under Jesus Christ, which He inaugurated at His first coming and will conclude when He returns.

Verse 5
The reference to "morning" or the "break of day" in verse 5 alludes to Abraham, who would rise at daybreak to pray to God.

Verse 10
Be still, and know that I am God;I will be exalted among the nations,
I will be exalted in the earth!
This verse is further developed in Psalm 47, which opens with the words "Oh, clap your hands, all you peoples!
Shout to God with the voice of triumph! It is all the nations of the world who are addressed.

Uses

In Judaism 
Portions of the psalm are used or referenced in several Jewish prayers. Verse 2 in the Hebrew is part of Selichot. Verse 8 is said in the daily morning service during the recitation of the incense offering, in Pesukei Dezimra, and in Uva Letzion; it is said in Uva Letzion in the Shabbat morning service, Yom Tov afternoon service, and Motza'ei Shabbat evening service as well. Verse 12 is part of the Havdalah ceremony. Yemenite Jews include it as part of Yehi kevod.

In the Siddur Avodas Yisroel, Psalm 46 is the psalm of the day for Shabbat Va'eira.

The psalm is recited as a prayer for the end of all wars.

Catholic Church
This psalm was traditionally recited or sung at the office of matins on Tuesday after St. Benedict of Nursia established his rule of St. Benedict around 530, mainly in the numerical order of the psalms. Today, Psalm 46 is sung or recited at Vespers on Friday of the first week of the liturgical four weekly cycle.

Book of Common Prayer
In the Church of England's Book of Common Prayer, this psalm is appointed to be read on the morning of the ninth day of the month.

Politics 
U.S. President Barack Obama referenced the psalm in several speeches, most notably his Tucson memorial speech and his speech on the 10th anniversary of the September 11 attacks in New York City.

Musical settings 
Martin Luther wrote and composed a hymn which paraphrases Psalm 46, "Ein feste Burg ist unser Gott", which was translated as "A Mighty Fortress Is Our God". Luther's hymn was called "the Marseillaise of the Reformation" by Heinrich Heine in his essay Zur Geschichte der Religion und Philosophie in Deutschland. It inspired many musical works, both religious and secular. Johann Sebastian Bach based one of his chorale cantatas, Ein feste Burg ist unser Gott, BWV 80, on Luther's hymn.

In the 17th century, Johann Pachelbel composed a motet setting of Psalm 46, Gott ist unser Zuversicht und Stärke. Heinrich Schütz wrote a setting of a paraphrase in German, "Ein feste Burg ist unser Gott", SWV 143, for the Becker Psalter, published first in 1628. In 1699, Michel-Richard Delalande based a grand motet on the psalm. Marc-Antoine Charpentier set in early 1690s a "Deus noster refugium" H.218, for soloists, chorus, 2 treble instruments and continuo.  Jean Philippe Rameau set the psalm for the motet Deus noster refugium.

In the eighteenth century, the child Mozart wrote a short motet to the text of the first verse as a gift to the British Museum and an homage to 16th century English composers such as Thomas Tallis. 

In contemporary music, the Christian duo Shane & Shane adapted the psalm into the song "Psalm 46 (Lord of Hosts)", which appeared on their 2016 album Psalms II.

Shakespeare's alleged involvement 
For several decades, some theorists have suggested that William Shakespeare placed his mark on the translated text of Psalm 46 that appears in the King James Bible, although many scholars view this as unlikely, stating that the translations were probably agreed upon by a committee of scholars. 

On the other hand, Shakespeare was in King James' service during the preparation of the King James Bible, and was generally considered to be 46 years old in 1611 when the translation was completed. There are a few extant examples of Shakespeare's actual signature, and as was customary at the time, with spelling being somewhat lax in those pre-standardized days, on at least one occasion he signed it 'Shakspeare', which divides into four and six letters, thus '46'. The 46th word from the beginning of Psalm 46 is "shake" and the 46th word from the end (omitting the liturgical mark "Selah") is "spear" ("speare" in the original spelling).

References

Sources

External links 

 
 
 For the leader. A song of the Korahites. According to alamoth. / God is our refuge and our strength, an ever-present help in distress text and footnotes, usccb.org United States Conference of Catholic Bishops
 Psalm 46 / God is our refuge and strength, a very present help in trouble Church of England

046